Pocahontas Times Print Shop is a historic building located at Marlinton, Pocahontas County, West Virginia. It was built in 1900, and is a one-story, rectangular frame building measuring approximately 21 feet by 75 feet. It was built to house The Pocahontas Times newspaper operations.  As late as the 1970s, it housed a paper folder and press installed around 1911.  The Pocahontas Times has been published since 1882.

It was listed on the National Register of Historic Places in 1977.

See also 
 Basin Republican-Rustler Printing Building
 Eagle Newspaper Office
 National Register of Historic Places listings in Pocahontas County, West Virginia

References

External links
The Pocahontas Times website

Industrial buildings and structures on the National Register of Historic Places in West Virginia
Industrial buildings completed in 1900
Buildings and structures in Pocahontas County, West Virginia
National Register of Historic Places in Pocahontas County, West Virginia
Printing in the United States
Newspaper headquarters in the United States
1900 establishments in West Virginia